The air sports tournaments at the 2017 World Games in Wrocław was played between 21 and 23 July. 64 acrobatic gymnastics competitors, from 22 nations, participated in the tournament. The air sports competition took place at Szymanów Airport in Szymanów.

Schedule

Participating nations
Poland, as the host country, receives a guaranteed spot, in case it were not to earn one by the regular qualifying methods.

Medal table

Medalists

See also
Air sports at the 2014 Asian Beach Games

References

External links
 Fédération Aéronautique Internationale
 Air sports on IWGA website
 Schedule
 Entry list
 Medalists
 Medals standing
 Results book

 
2017 World Games
World Games
2017